Don Corbett (October 5, 1942 – September 12, 2018) was an American college basketball coach for North Carolina A&T State University, where he led the program to seven NCAA tournament appearances from 1982 to 1988.

Corbett was born in Columbus, Georgia and raised in Thomasville. After graduating from Lincoln University in Jefferson City, Missouri and obtaining his master's degree from the University of Illinois at Urbana–Champaign, Corbett began his coaching career at Carver High School in Columbus, Georgia. After assistant coaching stints at South Carolina State and Tennessee State, he became head coach at Lincoln in 1971.

At NCAA Division II Lincoln, Corbett led his teams to an eight-year 159–59 record from 1971 to 1979. During that time, the Blue Tigers won three Mid-America Intercollegiate Athletics Association (MIAA) regular season championships (1972, 1975 and 1977) and one MIAA tournament title (1977). His teams earned five NCAA Division II tournament appearances (1972, 1975, 1976, 1977 and 1978) and never won fewer than 17 games in a season. Corbett's .729 winning percentage is the highest in program history. In 2014 he was named to the MIAA Hall of Fame.

In 1979, Corbett moved to Division I North Carolina A&T. After an initial rebuilding season where his Aggies went 8–19, Corbett's teams ran off a string of eight consecutive seasons winning either the Mid-Eastern Athletic Conference (MEAC) regular season or tournament championship (winning both in five seasons). The Aggies program won seven consecutive MEAC tournament titles between 1982 and 1988, a streak only equaled in Division I history by the Kentucky Wildcats. Corbett retired in 1993 with a 256–145 record in his thirteen seasons.

Corbett was inducted into several basketball halls of fame - including the MEAC Hall of Fame, the Guilford County Sports Hall of Fame, the MIAA Hall of Fame and the Lincoln University Athletic Hall of Fame. In 2006, North Carolina A&T named the court of the Corbett Sports Center after Corbett and fellow Aggie coaching great Cal Irvin.

Corbett died of cancer on September 12, 2018.

Head coaching record

References

External links
Coaching record @ sports-reference.com

1942 births
2018 deaths
American men's basketball coaches
Basketball coaches from Georgia (U.S. state)
College men's basketball head coaches in the United States
High school basketball coaches in Georgia (U.S. state)
Lincoln Blue Tigers men's basketball coaches
Lincoln University (Missouri) alumni
North Carolina A&T Aggies men's basketball coaches
People from Thomasville, Georgia
South Carolina State Bulldogs basketball coaches
Tennessee State Tigers basketball coaches
University of Illinois Urbana-Champaign alumni